The 2008 EuroBasket Division C was the third-ranked tier (lowest) of the bi-annual EuroBasket competition. The winner of this tournament was Azerbaijan.

Group phase

Group A

Group B

Final round

5th to 8th place
San Marino 73 – 57 Malta
Wales 77 – 93 Gibraltar

5th to 6th place
 San Marino 77 – 64 Gibraltar

7th to 8th place
Malta 84 – 67 Wales

Final standings

External links
 Results from FIBA-Europe

2008
2008–09 in European basketball
International basketball competitions hosted by the United Kingdom
2008 in Scottish sport
2008–09 in British basketball